The Pack may refer to:

Film and television
 The Pack (1977 film), a horror film directed by Robert Clouse
 The Pack, a 2009 film starring Lucie Arnaz
 The Pack (2010 film), a French films, also known as La meute
 The Pack (2015 film),  Australian horror film directed by Nick Robertson
 The Pack (2022 film), a Colombian-French drama film 
 The Pack (TV series), a 2020 reality television series hosted by Lindsey Vonn
 "The Pack" (Buffy the Vampire Slayer), a season 1 episode of Buffy the Vampire Slayer
 The Pack (Gargoyles), a team of villains on the animated series Gargoyles

Music
 The Pack, later Theatre of Hate, a British punk rock band formed in 1978
 The Pack (group), a rap group from Berkeley, California
 The Pack A.D., a garage rock duo from Vancouver, British Columbia

Other uses
 Pack (aircraft)
 Pack (canine)
 Green Bay Packers, an American football team based in Green Bay, WI
 Wolfpack, North Carolina State University in NCAA Division I athletics
 Toronto Wolfpack, a trans-Atlantic rugby league team based in Canada and the UK

See also
 
 
 Pack (disambiguation)